Sparkle is an open-source software framework for macOS designed to simplify updating software for the end user of a program. Sparkle's primary means of distributing updates is through "appcasting," a term coined for the practice of using an RSS enclosure to distribute updates and release notes.

At the end of 2013, development of Sparkle was ended by the original author, then later picked up by the newly formed Sparkle Project open source group on GitHub in June 2014 as the official continuation of the project.

Other OS alternatives

There are several open source Windows alternatives to offer similar functionality to Sparkle:
 wyUpdate (BSD licensed) in tandem with the AutomaticUpdater (LGPL licensed)
 WinSparkle (MIT licensed)

There is also a REALbasic implementation of Sparkle that works on macOS, Windows and Linux: RBSparkle.

References

External links

 Sparkle homepage
 Sparkle development page at GitHub
 Sparkle at MacUpdate

MacOS programming tools
Patch utilities
Software using the MIT license